Æthelmær is an Old English name borne by many males in Anglo-Saxon and post-Conquest England, including:

Æthelmær the Stout (died 1015), ealdorman, son of Æthelweard the historian
Æthelmær, brother of Eadric Streona (died 1017)
Eilmer of Malmesbury, or Æthelmær (fl. 1066), monk who experimented with aviation
Æthelmær of Elmham (fl. 1047-1070), bishop of Elmham and brother of Stigand
Herlewin, or Æthelmær, (died 1137), theologian

Old English given names
Masculine given names